Yin Khwin Shin Tan is a 2019 Burmese drama television series. It aired on Channel 9, from May 24, to July 27, 2019, on every Friday and Saturday at 19:30 for 20 episodes.

Cast
Hein Wai Yan as Phoe Thar
Aye Wutyi Thaung as San Waddy
Nyein Thaw as Nay Htet
Thun Sett as Honey
Thiri Soe as Yun Nge
Han Lay as May Moe
Oak Thar Kyaw as Kaung Kyaw
Khay La Yaung as No No

References

Burmese television series
Channel 9 (Burmese TV channel) original programming